Guyileh or Guyaleh or Gavileh or Govileh may refer to:
 Guyaleh, Kermanshah
 Guyileh, Khuzestan
 Gavileh, Kurdistan